Petrosedum sediforme, the pale stonecrop, is a perennial flowering plant in the family Crassulaceae. It has pointed, succulent, glaucous blue leaves and yellow, five-pointed flowers emerging on and inflorescence. The plant is native to mountainous and coastal regions of the Mediterranean Basin. It is sometimes cultivated as an ornamental rock garden plant.

References

Crassulaceae